The Youth Hostel Association of New Zealand (often shortened to YHA New Zealand or YHANZ) is a youth hostelling association in New Zealand.  it comprises 16 privately owned associate backpacker hostels—8 in the North Island, and 9 in the South Island. All properties are franchise or associate partners.

Celebrating the 75th anniversary of the organisation in 2007, then Governor-General Sir Anand Satyanand described YHA NZ as a "standout New Zealand organisation" and "such an iconic feature of holidaying in New Zealand". The YHA hostel in Wellington (now closed) won the Hostelworld "Hoscar" prize for Best Hostel in Oceania in 2007 and 2008. In 2009 the YHA hostel in Rotorua (now closed) won the award.

In November 2021, it was reported that YHA New Zealand would close its remaining 11 managed hostels in December, due largely to COVID-related financial losses, however 20 other individually-owned YHAs will continue to operate as normal.  These 20 individually-owned YHAs are as follows: Ahipara, Paihia, Bay of Islands, National Park, Taupō, Waitomo, Whanganui, Whangarei, Arthur's Pass, Golden Bay, Hanmer Springs, Kinloch, Nelson, Picton, Punakaiki, Springfield, Westport.

History 
The Sunlight League was formed in 1931 in New Zealand and their attention was drawn to German youth hostels later that year; youth hostels had begun in Altena in 1912. The first ones in the Southern Hemisphere were those of the Youth Hostel Association of New Zealand, after its formation on 8 April 1932, at a meeting of 9 Canterbury tramping organisations, brought together by the League and chaired by Sir Arthur Dudley Dobson. Sir Arthur was elected as President and vice-presidents included Sir Heaton Rhodes and Professors Arnold Wall and Macmillan Brown. Cora Wilding had negotiated for trampers belonging to the clubs forming the Association to stay at nearby Le Bon's Bay, Port Levy, Pigeon's Bay, Okain's Bay, Akaroa, Duvauchelle, and Hill Top, all on Banks Peninsula. Teddington and Diamond Harbour were also added in 1932. YHA-NZ had 895 members by 1953. in 1983 there were 47 hostels, 6,700 life members and 21,000 ordinary members.

It has been a member association of Hostelling International since 1946. YHA New Zealand was established in 1932 in Canterbury by Cora Wilding. The national office is based in Christchurch. A national council was created in 1955. In 1965 there were 39 hostels and 7000 members. Previously, the patron of the association was the Governor-General of New Zealand.

Current YHA-NZ hostels 
This is a list of current YHA-NZ hostels. This section was up-to-date .

Former hostels 
This section lists the locations of former YHA-NZ hostels.

References 
 Cora and Co: The first half-century of New Zealand youth hostelling by Dion Crooks (1982, Youth Hostel Association of  New Zealand)

External links
 

Tourism in New Zealand
Hostelling International member associations
Organisations based in Christchurch